The following is a list of radio stations in the Canadian province of Newfoundland and Labrador, .

See also 
 List of radio stations in the Americas

External links
Canadian Communications Foundation - History of radio stations in Newfoundland and Labrador

Newfoundland and Labrador
Radio stations